Margaret Booth (January 16, 1898 – October 28, 2002) was an American film editor.

Early life and career
Born in Los Angeles, she started her Hollywood career as a "patcher", editing films by D. W. Griffith, around 1915. Her brother was actor Elmer Booth. Later, she worked for Louis B. Mayer when he was an independent film producer. When Mayer merged with others to form Metro-Goldwyn-Mayer in 1924, she worked as a director's assistant with that company. She edited several films starring Greta Garbo, including Camille (1936).

Booth edited such diverse films as Wise Girls (1929), Mutiny on the Bounty (1935, for which she was nominated for an Academy Award), A Yank at Oxford (1938), The Way We Were (1973), The Sunshine Boys (1975), The Goodbye Girl (1977), The Cheap Detective (1978), Seems Like Old Times (1980), and Annie (1982). She was supervising editor and associate producer on several films for producer Ray Stark, culminating with executive producer credit on The Slugger's Wife (1985) when she was 87. Her list of official credits, however, represents only a fraction of her film work. In its 1982 article about Booth's long tenure as MGM's supervising film editor, the Village Voice describes her as "the final authority of every picture the studio made for 30 years."

Awards
The Academy of Motion Picture Arts and Sciences in 1978 presented her an Academy Honorary Award for her work in film editing. She is the second longest-lived person (after Luise Rainer) to have been given an Oscar. In 1983, she was awarded the Women in Film Crystal Award for outstanding women who, through their endurance and the excellence of their work, have helped to expand the role of women within the entertainment industry. In 1990, Booth was also honored with the American Cinema Editors Career Achievement Award.

Death and legacy
Booth, at age 104, died in 2002 from complications after suffering a stroke. She is interred at Inglewood Park Cemetery in Inglewood California. In its obituary for Booth, the British newspaper The Guardian states, "All the filmmakers had to go through her in order to have a final editing of sound and vision approved," while describing her approach:  She was the first "cutter" to be called a "film editor."

Selected filmography
Fine Clothes (1925)
 Memory Lane (1926)
 The Enemy (1927)
 Bringing Up Father (1928)
 Wise Girls (1929)
 Mutiny on the Bounty (1935)
 Camille (1936)
 A Yank at Oxford (1938)
 The Way We Were (1973)
 The Sunshine Boys (1975)
 The Goodbye Girl (1977)
 The Cheap Detective (1978)
 Seems Like Old Times (1980)
 Annie (1982)

See also

 List of centenarians (actors, filmmakers and entertainers)

References

External links

Margaret Booth at Women Film Pioneers Project
October 31, 2002 obituary – Los Angeles Times
Gomery, Douglas (2000). "Margaret Booth," in Tom Pendergast and Sara Pendergast (editors), International Dictionary of Film and Filmmakers, Edition 4 (St. James Press), . Online version of article retrieved December 24, 2007.
Lewis, Kevin (2006). "The Moviola Mavens and the Moguls: Three Pioneering Women Editors Who Had the Respect of Early Hollywood's Power-Brokers", in Editors Guild Magazine, Vol 27, No. 2 (March–April 2006). Archived at WebCite from this original URL 2008-06-22.

Literature on Margaret Booth

1898 births
2002 deaths
Agnes Scott College people
American centenarians
American film editors
Film producers from California
Burials at Inglewood Park Cemetery
People from Los Angeles
Academy Honorary Award recipients
Women film pioneers
American women film producers
American women film editors
Women centenarians
20th-century American women